George Richard Tiller (August 8, 1941 – May 31, 2009) was an American physician from Wichita, Kansas. He gained national attention as the medical director of Women's Health Care Services, which was one of only three abortion clinics nationwide at the time which provided late termination of pregnancy.

During his tenure with the center, which began in 1975 and continued the medical practice of his father, Tiller was frequently targeted with protest and violence by anti-abortion groups and individuals. His clinic was firebombed in 1986. In 1993 Tiller was shot in both arms by anti-abortion extremist Shelley Shannon; she was sentenced to 23 years in prison and was released in 2018. On May 31, 2009, Tiller was fatally shot in the side of the head by anti-abortion extremist Scott Roeder while Tiller served as an usher during the Sunday morning service at his church in Wichita. Roeder was convicted of murder on January 29, 2010, and sentenced to life imprisonment.

Personal life and career
Tiller was born in Wichita, Kansas, the son of Catherine and Dean Jackson "Jack" Tiller, a prominent physician He studied at the University of Kansas School of Medicine from 1963 to 1967. Shortly thereafter, he held a medical internship with United States Navy, and served as flight surgeon in Camp Pendleton, California, in 1969 and 1970. In July 1970, he planned to start a dermatology residency.

On August 21, 1970, his parents, sister and brother-in-law were killed in an aircraft accident. In her will, his sister requested that Tiller take care of her one-year-old son. Tiller intended to go back to Wichita, close up his father's family practice and then go back to become a dermatologist, but he felt pressure to take over his father's family practice. Tiller's father had performed abortions at his practice. After hearing about a woman who had died from an illegal abortion, Tiller stayed in Wichita to continue his father's practice.

Tiller struggled with substance abuse at various points in his life, which came to a head in 1984 when he was arrested for driving under the influence. He sought treatment, overcame his addiction, and later served on the Kansas Medical Society's impaired physicians committee.

Tiller's practice performed postviability abortions, which made Tiller a focal point for anti-abortion protest and violence. Tiller treated patients who discovered late in pregnancy that their fetuses had severe or fatal birth defects. He also aborted healthy late-term fetuses in cases where two doctors certified that carrying the fetus to term would cause the woman "substantial and irreversible impairment of a major bodily function." His practice frequently made him the focus of anti-abortion groups. The Kansas Coalition for Life kept a daily vigil outside Tiller's facility from May 9, 2004, until May 31, 2009. The group known as Operation Rescue held an event called "The Summer of Mercy" in July and August 1991, focusing on Tiller's clinic but also protesting other abortion providers in Wichita, Kansas. Years later, a branch that split from the main Operation Rescue group moved from California to Kansas specifically to focus on Tiller, initially named Operation Rescue West.

In 2007, Kansas prosecutors charged Tiller with 19 misdemeanors for allegedly consulting a physician who was financially affiliated with him in late-term abortion cases in 2003. Kansas law prohibits abortions after the beginning of fetal viability unless two doctors certify that continuing the pregnancy would cause the woman "substantial and irreversible impairment of a major bodily function", with the requirement that the two consulting doctors must not be "financially affiliated" with the doctor performing the abortion. The case became a cause célèbre for both supporters and opponents of legal abortion. WorldNetDaily columnist Jack Cashill compared the trial to the Nuremberg Trials of Nazi war criminals, while Icahn School of Medicine at Mount Sinai Professor Jacob Appel described Tiller as "a genuine hero who ranks alongside Susan B. Anthony and Martin Luther King Jr. in the pantheon of defenders of human liberty." The trial took place in March 2009, with the jury finding Tiller not guilty on all charges on March 27, approximately two months before his death.

At the time of his death, Tiller was board certified with the American Board of Family Practice, an Associate of the American Society of Addiction Medicine, and a clinical instructor in the Department of Family Medicine for Wesley Medical Center, where he had previously served as president of the medical staff.

Negative publicity: The O'Reilly Factor
Tiller was discussed in 28 episodes of the Fox News talk show The O'Reilly Factor in the years leading up to his death, focusing national attention on his practice. Although he later denied it, show host Bill O'Reilly sometimes described him as "Tiller the Baby Killer," a nickname that Congressman Robert Dornan had used on the floor of the US House of Representatives. O'Reilly said he would not want to be Tiller, Kathleen Sebelius, and other pro-abortion rights Kansas politicians "if there is a judgment day." On November 3, 2006, O'Reilly featured an exclusive segment on The O'Reilly Factor, saying that he had an "inside source" with official clinic documentation indicating that Tiller performed late-term abortions to alleviate "temporary depression" in pregnant women. He characterized the doctor as "a savage on the loose, killing babies willy-nilly," and accused him of "operating a death mill," and of protecting the rapists of children. He suggested that Tiller performed abortions for women who had "a bit of a headache or anxiety" or who felt "a bit blue." O'Reilly's campaign against Tiller included the on-air disclosure of confidential patient information provided by former-Kansas Attorney General Phill Kline, for which breach of professional conduct Kline's law license was eventually suspended indefinitely.

After Tiller was murdered, O'Reilly denied responsibility and defended his campaign against Tiller, saying: "When I heard about Tiller’s murder, I knew pro-abortion zealots and Fox News haters would attempt to blame us for the crime, and that’s exactly what has happened. [...] Every single thing we said about Tiller was true, and my analysis was based on those facts. [...] Now, it’s clear that the far left is exploiting—exploiting—the death of the doctor. Those vicious individuals want to stifle any criticism of people like Tiller. That—and hating Fox News—is the real agenda here."

Violence directed at Tiller
Throughout his career, Tiller was a frequent target of anti-abortion violence. In June 1986, his clinic was firebombed. While it was being rebuilt, Tiller displayed a sign reading "Hell no, we won't go." On August 19, 1993, anti-abortion extremist Shelley Shannon shot Tiller five times, while he was in his car. At the time she attacked Tiller, Shannon had been an anti-abortion extremist for five years and had written letters of support to the convicted murderer Michael Griffin, who had murdered Dr. David Gunn. She called him "a hero." At her trial in state court, Shannon testified that there was nothing wrong with trying to kill Tiller. The jury convicted Shannon of attempted murder, and she was sentenced to 11 years in prison. The following year, Shannon was sentenced to an additional 20 years in prison on charges of arson, interference with commerce by force and interstate travel in aid of racketeering in connection to her participation in several fires and acid attacks on abortion clinics.

Assassination of George Tiller in May 2009

Tiller was fatally shot in the side of the head on May 31, 2009, by anti-abortion extremist Scott Roeder during worship services at the Reformation Lutheran Church in Wichita, where he was serving as an usher and handing out church bulletins. After threatening to shoot two people who initially pursued him, Roeder fled and escaped in his car.

Cheryl Sullenger, at the time vice president of the anti-abortion organization Operation Rescue West, was in prolonged communication with Roeder before he assassinated Tiller. Sullenger initially denied any contact with Roeder. After her name and cell phone number was discovered on a post-it note on the dashboard of Roeder's car, she subsequently admitted that she had informed Roeder of Tiller's scheduled court dates.

On June 2, 2009, Roeder was charged with first-degree murder and two counts of aggravated assault in connection with the shooting, subsequently convicted in January 2010 on those charges, and sentenced on April 1, 2010, to life imprisonment without parole for 50 years, the maximum sentence available in Kansas. The no-parole term was later reduced to 25 years.

Tiller's killing was largely condemned by groups and individuals on both sides of the abortion issue. US President Barack Obama said he was "shocked and outraged" by the murder. David N. O'Steen, director of the National Right to Life Committee, said the group "unequivocally condemns any such acts of violence regardless of motivation". Some others who spoke publicly were more confrontational. Anti-abortion extremist Randall Terry described Tiller as a mass murderer and said of other abortion providers, "We must continue to expose them in our communities and peacefully protest them at their offices and homes, and yes, even their churches", and Southern Baptist minister and radio host Wiley Drake said, "I am glad that he is dead."

After the shooting, Tiller's colleague, Leroy Carhart of Nebraska, stated that Tiller's clinic, Women's Health Care Services, would reopen after being closed for one week to mourn his death. The following week, Tiller's family announced that the clinic would be closed permanently.

The aftermath of Tiller's assassination was the subject of the 2013 documentary After Tiller, which followed the daily lives and work of the four remaining late-term abortion providers in the United States.

The George Tiller Memorial Abortion Fund was established by the National Network of Abortion Funds. In 2019, during the successful 23–14 vote confirmation of David Toland as Kansas Secretary of Commerce, objections were raised to his nomination because he had led the Thrive Allen County non-profit, which had obtained $20,000 in grants from the Fund in 2015 and 2018, to help low-income pregnant women to stop smoking and to help prevent their unintended pregnancies. State Senators Rob Olson and Mary Pilcher-Cook, joined 12 other Republican senators, and community opponents including Mary Kay Culp, leader of Kansans for Life, to oppose his nomination.

Trust Women Foundation, a 501(c)(3) charitable organization, purchased and re-opened the clinic that Tiller operated and continues to perform abortions and other medical services. The foundation currently operates two clinics, the aforementioned in Wichita, KS, as well as one in Oklahoma City, OK. The organization also operated a third clinic in Seattle, WA until it was closed on December 31, 2019.

See also

 Abortion in the United States
 Anti-abortion violence
 Barnett Slepian
 David Gunn
 Stochastic terrorism 
 Right-wing terrorism

References

External links

 George R. Tiller M.D. Memorial Fund
 Are Some Anti-Abortion Attacks Domestic Terrorism? NOW on PBS Piece aired following Dr. Tiller's death
 "George Tiller speaks about the history of violence against him and his medical practice," Kansas City The Pitch
 "Remembered for Lifelong Dedication to Women's Reproductive Health" Five women (two of them doctors) who worked with Dr. Tiller; Democracy Now!, June 1, 2009 (video, audio, and print transcript)
 Criminal Complaint (Kansas v. Roeder) FindLaw, June 2, 2009
 Letters of condolence sent to the editors of The New York Times

1941 births
2009 deaths
20th-century American physicians
20th-century Lutherans
21st-century American physicians
21st-century Lutherans
American Lutherans
American abortion providers
American primary care physicians
American shooting survivors
Assassinated American people
 
Deaths by firearm in Kansas
Military personnel from Kansas
People from Wichita, Kansas
People murdered in Kansas
Physicians from Kansas
United States Navy Medical Corps officers
University of Kansas alumni
Victims of anti-abortion violence in the United States